Peire Espanhol ( 1150 – c. 1220) was a Limousin troubadour with three extant cansos, including one religious alba, "Ar levatz sus, francha corteza gans!". His works have appeared, edited and with French translations, in Peter T. Ricketts, "Les poésies de Peire Espanhol: édition critique et traduction" in Studies in Honor of Hans-Erich Keller: Medieval French and Occitan Literature and Romance Linguistics, Rupert T. Pickens, ed. (Kalamazoo, 1993), pp. 383–95.

Sources
Bibliographie nationale française

1150s births
1220s deaths
12th-century French troubadours
People from Limousin